Leptalpheus is a genus of shrimp in the family Alpheidae, containing the following eight species:
Leptalpheus axianassae Dworschak & Coelho, 1999
Leptalpheus denticulatus Anker & Marin, 2009
Leptalpheus dworschaki Anker & Marin, 2009
Leptalpheus felderi Anker, Vera Caripe & Lira, 2006
Leptalpheus forceps A. B. Williams, 1965
Leptalpheus mexicanus Ríos & Carvacho, 1983
Leptalpheus pacificus A. H. Banner & D. M. Banner, 1974
Leptalpheus pierrenoeli Anker, 2008

References

Alpheidae
Decapod genera